Sir Robert Crane, 1st Baronet (1586 – February 1643) of Chilton, Suffolk and of Buckenham Tofts, Norfolk, was an English politician who sat in the House of Commons variously between 1614 and 1643.

Crane was the son of Henry Crane of Chilton and educated in the law at the Inner Temple and Lincoln's Inn.

In 1614 Crane was elected Member of Parliament for Sudbury and held the seat until 1620. He was elected MP for Suffolk in 1621 and  re-elected MP for Sudbury in 1624 and 1625.  He was created a Baronet of Chilton, in Suffolk  on 21 April 1626. Crane was re-elected MP for Suffolk in 1626 and re-elected MP for Sudbury in 1628. He sat until 1629 when King Charles decided to rule without parliament for eleven years. In 1632–33 Crane was High Sheriff of Suffolk.

In April 1640, Crane was elected MP for Sudbury in the Short Parliament and in November 1640 for the Long Parliament. He held the seat until his death in February 1643.  
 
The baronetcy became extinct on Crane's death as he had no sons. He had married firstly Dorothy Hobart, daughter of Sir Henry Hobart, 1st Baronet Lord Chief Justice of the Court of Common Pleas, by whom he had no issue. He married secondly, Susan Alington, ?granddaughter of Sir Giles Alington of Horsebeath. They had four daughters - Mary who married Sir Ralph Hare, 1st Baronet,  Anne who married firstly Sir William Airmine, 2nd Baronet and secondly John Lord Belasyse, Susan who married Sir Edward Walpole,  and Katherine who married Edmund Bacon, nephew of Sir Robert Bacon, 3rd Baronet.

After Crane's death, Lady Crane married  secondly, Isaac Appleton, esq. of Waldingfeld.

References

 

 
 
 

1586 births
1643 deaths
Members of the Inner Temple
Members of Lincoln's Inn
High Sheriffs of Suffolk
English MPs 1614
English MPs 1621–1622
English MPs 1624–1625
English MPs 1625
English MPs 1626
English MPs 1628–1629
English MPs 1640 (April)
English MPs 1640–1648
Baronets in the Baronetage of England